Atocha is an administrative neighborhood of Madrid belonging to the district of Arganzuela.

Etymology

Geography
Located in the middle of Madrid, the ward is formed by a strip between the avenue Calle de Méndez Álvaro (south-west), and the north-eastern area of Madrid Atocha railway station, that occupies great part of its territory. The northern border is at the square Plaza del Emperador Carlos V and the southern one in the avenue Calle de Pedro Bosch.

Atocha borders the districts of Centro (north), Retiro (north-east), Puente de Vallecas (south) and with the Arganzuelan wards of Palos de Moguer, Las Delicias and Legazpi.

Transport
Home of Madrid Atocha, the main railway station of the city, the ward is also served by the Metro lines 1 (at Estación del Arte and Atocha stations), 6 (at Méndez Álvaro station) and by several lines of a commuter rail network named Cercanías Madrid.

References

External links

Atocha at WikiMadrid

Wards of Madrid
Arganzuela